Ostrava-City District is a district (okres) within Moravian-Silesian Region of the Czech Republic. Its capital is the city of Ostrava.

List of municipalities
Čavisov – Dolní Lhota – Horní Lhota – Klimkovice – Olbramice – Ostrava – Šenov – Stará Ves nad Ondřejnicí – Václavovice – Velká Polom – Vratimov – Vřesina – Zbyslavice

See also 
Silesia Euroregion

References

 
Districts of the Czech Republic